Luz María Sapag (June 15, 1944 – July 7, 2010) was an Argentine politician, Mayor of the city of San Martín de los Andes and formerly a Senator representing the Neuquén Province under the aegis of the Neuquino People's Movement.

Sapag was born in Cutral Có, Neuquén. She was a member of the influential Arab Argentine Sapag family – daughter of Elías Sapag, a senator; niece of Felipe Sapag, five-time governor of Neuquén; and sister to Jorge Sapag, governor of Neuquén from 2007.

She became secretary of government of the municipality of San Martín de los Andes in 1987, and in 1991 became Mayor of the city. She was re-elected in 1995, and in 1999 was elected to the Provincial Legislature.

Luz Sapag was elected to the Senate in 2001, and later served as president of the Environmental Committee. In June 2006, prosecutors in Neuquén asked the Argentine Congress to lift her immunity so that she could face trial for abuse of office whilst Mayor of San Martín de los Andes.

In June 2007 she was re-elected Mayor of San Martín de los Andes and stepped down from the Senate.

Sapag died in a road accident in San Martín de los Andes in the morning of July 7, 2010.

One of Sapag's daughters, Carmen Lucila Crexell, went on to be elected to the Argentine Senate for Neuquén as well.

External links
Senate profile (Spanish)

References

1944 births
2010 deaths
People from Neuquén Province
Argentine people of Lebanese descent
Members of the Argentine Senate for Neuquén
Women mayors of places in Argentina
21st-century Argentine women politicians
21st-century Argentine politicians
Road incident deaths in Argentina
Neuquén People's Movement politicians
Sapag family
20th-century Argentine women politicians
20th-century Argentine politicians